Emotional is the fourth album by American singer Jeffrey Osborne. It was released by A&M Records on May 27, 1986. Produced by Osborne, Rod Temperton, Richard Perry, T. C. Campbell, Michael Masser, and George Duke, Emotional reached number five on the US Billboard R&B Albums chart and number 27 on the Billboard 200. It spawned one of Osborne's biggest pop hits, "You Should Be Mine (The Woo Woo Song)" which peaked at number 13 on the US Billboard Hot 100. Other tracks that charted include "In Your Eyes", "Soweto", and "Room with a View."

Critical reception

AllMusic editor Jason Elias, who had praised previous albums by Osborne, called it "quite a disappointment" and "not exactly a work of cohesion." He found that Emotional "is overly slick with poor song choices and barely there vocals" and compared it to Whitney Houston's early material "with its use of multiple producers and pop material." Connie Johnson from Los Angeles Times felt that "while lacking a blockbuster [...] this album is well-balanced in its blend of exuberant, up-tempo cuts and heart-rending love songs. Simplicity would have gotten the point across far better. Still, in his bid for a broader audience, Osborne hasn’t sacrificed all of the soul basics."

Track listing

Personnel 
Performers and Musicians

 Jeffrey Osborne – lead and backing vocals, handclaps (1), percussion (9)
 Bobby Lyle – keyboards (1), handclaps (1)
 T.C. Campbell – keyboard solo (1), keyboards (3, 6, 9, 10), synthesizers (10)
 Andy Goldmark – synthesizers (2), drum programming (2)
 Bruce Roberts –  synthesizers (2), drum programming (2)
 Robbie Buchanan – additional synthesizers (2), electric piano (4)
 Jeff Lorber – additional synthesizers (2), synth solo (7), guitar (7), drum programming (7)
 Hamish Stuart – keyboards (3), synth solo (3), guitar solo (3), backing vocals (3)
 Bob Moore – keyboards (3)
 Randy Kerber – acoustic piano (4)
 Bill Payne – acoustic piano (5)
 David Tyson – synthesizers (5), drum programming (5)
 Steve George – additional synthesizers (5)
 Howie Rice – additional synthesizers (5)
 Steve Mitchell – additional synthesizers (5), synthesizers (7), drum programming (7)
 George Duke – Yamaha DX7 (8), Synclavier (8)
 Paul Jackson Jr. – guitar (1, 2, 4, 9)
 Dann Huff – guitar (2, 5)
 Charles Fearing – guitar (5, 6)
 Chuck Gentry – guitar (8)
 Maitland Ward – guitar (9, 10)
 Freddie Washington – bass (1), handclaps (1)
 Nathan East – bass (4, 5, 7)
 Byron Miller – bass (10) 
 John Robinson – drums (1, 2, 4, 6, 8), handclaps (1), brushes (9), tom-tom fills (9)
 Ricky Lawson – drums (3, 9, 10) 
 Paul Fox – drum programming (5)
 Eddie Schwartz – drum programming (5)
 Rod Temperton – Roland TR-808 (1), handclaps (1)
 Paulinho da Costa – percussion (2, 5, 7)
 Michael Masser – arrangements (4)
 Gene Page – arrangements (4)
 Alex Brown – backing vocals (1, 2, 10)
 Portia Griffin – backing vocals (1, 3, 6, 8, 10), lead vocals (6)
 Joyce Kennedy –  backing vocals (1)
 Marcy Levy – backing vocals (1)
 Vesta Williams – backing vocals (1)
 Bunny Hall – backing vocals (2)
 Stephanie Spurill – backing vocals (2)
 Yolanda Davis – backing vocals (3, 6, 10)
 Kevin Dorsey – backing vocals (3)
 Lynette Hawkins – backing vocals (5, 7)
 Tramaine Hawkins – backing vocals (5, 7)
 Michelle Jordan – backing vocals (5)
 Jeanie Tracy – backing vocals (5, 7)
 Walter Hawkins – backing vocals (7)
 Lynn Davis – backing vocals (8)
 Marta Woodhull – children's choir director on  "Soweto" 
 Children's choir on "Soweto" – Monica Calhan, David Chan, Kelly Chan, Kristina Chan, Susan Guzman, Michelle Poston, Becky Ramirez, Jessica Robertson, Teri Robin, Andrea Scott, Tasha Scott, Veronique Vicari, Angela White and Christopher White

Production and Technical

 Jeffrey Osborne – producer (1, 3, 6, 9, 10)
 Rod Temperton – producer (1)
 Richard Perry – producer (2, 5, 7)
 Andy Goldmark – co-producer (2)
 Bruce Roberts – co-producer (2)
 Frank Musker – co-producer (3)
 Hamish Stuart – co-producer (3)
 Michael Masser – producer (4)
 T.C. Campbell – producer (6, 9, 10)
 George Duke – producer (8)
 Bradford Rosenberger – production coordinator (2, 5, 7)
 Alice Murrell – production assistant (8)
 Thaddeus Edwards – album production assistant 
 Tommy Vicari – recording (1, 3, 6, 9, 10), mixing (1, 3, 4, 6, 8, 9, 10), remix engineer (2, 5, 7)
 John Boghosian – recording (2, 5, 7)
 Michael Brooks – recording (2, 5, 7)
 Phil Moores – recording (3)
 Dean Burt – recording (4)
 Michael Mancini – recording (4)
 Erik Zobler – recording (8)
 Larry Ferguson – additional engineer (1, 3, 6, 9, 10)
 Khaliq Glover – additional engineer (1, 3, 6, 9, 10)
 David Luke – additional engineer (1, 2, 3, 5, 7)
 Sharon Rice – additional engineer (1, 9, 10)
 Wally Buck – additional engineer (2, 5, 7)
 Glen Holguin – additional engineer (2, 5, 7), assistant engineer (2, 5, 7)
 Jay Rifkin – additional engineer (2, 5, 7)
 Ernie Sheesley – additional engineer (2, 5, 7)
 Laura Livingston – additional engineer (6)
 Ken Fowler – additional engineer (9)
 Julie Last – assistant engineer (2, 5, 7)
 Craig Miller – assistant engineer (2, 5, 7)
 Mitch Gibson – assistant engineer (8)
 Ralph Sutton – mix assistant (4)
 Mixbusters – album remixing 
 Brian Gardner – mastering 
 Chuck Beeson – art direction, design 
 Bonnie Schiffman – photography
 Ton Sur Ton – wardrobe
 Jack Nelson & Associates – management

Studios
 Recorded at Lion Share Recording Studio, The Complex, Studio 55 and Record One (Los Angeles, CA); Fantasy Studios (Berkeley, CA); Music Grinder Studios, Baby'O Recorders and Le Gonks West (Hollywood, CA); Devonshire Sound Studios (North Hollywood, CA); The Hit Factory (New York, NY).
 Track 8 mixed at Lion Share Recording Studio.
 Mastered at Bernie Grundman Mastering (Hollywood, CA).

Charts

Weekly charts

Year-end charts

Certifications

References

1986 albums
Jeffrey Osborne albums
A&M Records albums
Albums produced by George Duke
Albums produced by Richard Perry
Albums produced by Rod Temperton
Albums produced by Michael Masser